"Float" is a song recorded by Canadian country group Tim and the Glory Boys. The song was written by the band's frontman Tim Neufeld along with Rodney Clawson and Allen Salmon, while Salmon also produced the track.

Background
Tim Neufeld stated that "Float" was the first song of the band's that "perfectly communicated the vibes we live by". He described floating as "possibly the oldest and most universally enjoyed leisure activity there has ever been," adding that collaborating with Rodney Clawson and Allen Salmon was "all of my dreams coming true". The song was recorded in both Chilliwack, British Columbia and Nashville, Tennessee.

Music video
The official music video for "Float" was directed by Travis Nesbitt premiered on YouTube on July 14, 2022. It was filmed in Abbotsford, British Columbia and features the band members Tim Neufeld, Colin Trask, and Brenton Thorvaldson.

Charts

References

2022 songs
2022 singles
Tim and the Glory Boys songs
Songs written by Rodney Clawson
Sony Music singles